The 1996 CONCACAF U-17 Tournament determined the three CONCACAF representatives that qualified to the 1997 FIFA U-17 World Championship in Egypt. Trinidad and Tobago hosted the championships between 18–31 August.

Qualified teams

 
 
 
 
 
 
 
 
 
 
  (host)

First round

Group 1

Group 2

Group 3

Final round
Costa Rica, Mexico, and Canada qualified to the Final round as group winners, USA joined as best second place.

References

External links
 CONCACAF.com – Official website

1996
Under
1996
1996 in youth association football
1996 in Trinidad and Tobago football